Alexander or Alex Randall may refer to:

Alexander Randall (Wisconsin politician) (1819–1872), former Governor of Wisconsin
Alexander Randall (Maryland politician) (1803–1881), former Attorney General of Maryland
Alex Randall, a character in the Outlander book series

See also
Alex Randall (Alexandra; born 1982), British lighting designer
Alexander Rendell (born 1990), Thai actor